Andrés Cantor (born December 22, 1962) is an Argentine-American sportscaster and pundit who works in the United States providing Spanish-language commentary and analysis in sports. Cantor is well known among both Spanish- and English speakers for his narration of association football matches, and shouting "¡Gooooooooooool! when one is scored. Outside of football commentary, he covers other sports as well. Cantor has dual citizenship with Argentina and the United States.

Early life
Cantor was born in Buenos Aires, Argentina. He moved with his family to the Southern California area when he was a teen, where he attended San Marino High School and then graduated from the University of Southern California. Andrés is Jewish.  

His mother was born in Romania, and migrated to Argentina at the age of 13, while his father was born in Argentina.  His paternal grandparents were from Poland, and fled during the Nazi occupation. His favorite team is Boca Juniors from Argentina.

Professional career
Cantor is famous for his signature bellowing of "¡Gooooooooooooooooooooooooooooooooooooooool!" after a score in football. , a famous Argentine journalist who began narrating on radio in the 1940s, is widely considered the father of "peligro de gol" "danger of goal being scored", "gol, gol, gol, gooooool", etc.  His style has been imitated by prominent football narrators throughout Latin America and Spain.  It stemmed from the desire to let families and friends who have stepped away from a game know that a goal has been scored.  

However, due to translation and cultural dissonance issues, it was largely absent from the lexicon of British play-by-play commentators.  Prior to joining Univision in 1987, Cantor was the first to introduce this climactic scoring call to a U.S. audience, while working at Univision, making him popular with English-speaking viewers. He first used it at the 1990 FIFA World Cup, but it became especially popular during the 1994 World Cup, which was held in the United States. Cantor made guest appearances on the Late Show with David Letterman during the '94 and '98 tournaments, and after the tournament was over. He was broadcasting from Paris for the Late Show during the 1998 World Cup. The call is now being sold as a ringtone on  Telemundo's website. He says that Diego Maradona's goal at the 1986 World Cup, in which he ran from midfield past five English defenders to score, brought tears to his eyes (Cantor was working at the game). That goal became known as the "Goal of the Century", and took place after the infamous "Hand of God" goal. The yell was also used in a Volkswagen commercial that aired in the U.S. around the time of the 1998 World Cup.

Another unique line of Cantor's can be heard whenever a game reaches half-time or is over.  He delivers the line, "El árbitro dice que no hay tiempo para más" ("The referee says there is no time for more").

Telemundo Deportes
Cantor currently works for Telemundo Deportes, NBC Sports's Spanish-language division, and does play-by-play for matches on both Telemundo and its sister cable network Universo. Manuel Sol joins him as a color commentator for most games. At the 2004 Summer Olympics, where Telemundo was the first-ever U.S. Spanish-language network to broadcast the Olympics, Cantor worked as both a studio anchor and the play-by-play announcer for baseball. He went to Telemundo after several years at Univisión. Telemundo's other anchor for the games, Jessí Losada, worked with Cantor at Univisión before also leaving. XM Satellite Radio, in partnership with Cantor, launched a Spanish-language sports network.

Cantor anchored Telemundo's coverage of the 2012 Summer Olympics in London from the network's studios in Hialeah, Florida. He was also the play-by-play announcer for football during the games. Cantor anchored as chief commentator for Telemundo's coverage of the 2022 FIFA World Cup. During that year's World Cup Final, as Gonzalo Montiel kicked the game-winning penalty for Argentina, Cantor broke into tears on the live broadcast as he called his home country World Cup champions.

Futbol de Primera Radio Network
Andrés Cantor is the owner and main play-by-play announcer of Futbol de Primera, a radio network which owns the Spanish-language radio rights of the FIFA World Cups since 2002. FDP also broadcasts the Mexico national team, CONCACAF Gold Cup, Copa América (CONMEBOL) among other sports properties. Andrés Cantor hosts a daily show, Futbol de Primera, which airs nationally on more than 100 affiliates.

NBC Sports
Cantor's first English-language assignment was the 2000 Summer Olympics in Sydney, where he called both men's and women's football for NBC, complete with his signature call of “Goooool!” At the 2008 Summer Olympics in Beijing, Cantor provided only Spanish-language commentary for sister network Telemundo.

Cantor had performed both English and Spanish-language broadcasts for the 2020 Summer Olympics in Tokyo in 2021.

Other notable accomplishments
In 2008, Cantor appeared in the American live-action film Speed Racer as one of the grand Prix announcers.

Cantor is the author of the book Goooal! a Celebration of Football. Andres Cantor's appearance booking fee can range from $5,000 to $10,000.

In 2010, Cantor was featured in the Mike McGlone series of GEICO commercials where he is introduced as an announcer who could make any sport exciting. Subsequently, the camera cuts to him animatedly announcing a chess match.

In 2011, he is uncredited for the role of the Spanish football announcer in an episode of the Disney Channel series Phineas and Ferb.

U.S. show Person of Interest used his 'Goooooooool' in the episode "Cura te Ipsum." When Reese and Fusco confront the drug dealers at their apartment, there is a goal scored during a football match on television. The famous "Gooooooool", seen in the U.S. on NBC's Deportes Telemundo network, can be heard in the background.

In 2014, Cantor was featured in an ad campaign for Volkswagen of America. The campaign was launched for the 2014 FIFA World Cup, and depicts him offering play-by-play announcing while his son Nicolas drives a new Volkswagen Golf GTI.

Cantor was featured as an announcer in the Walt Disney film Muppets Most Wanted in March 2014.

He voiced himself in The Simpsons episode "You Don't Have to Live Like a Referee".

Awards
In 1994, Cantor was honored as "Sports Personality of the Year" by the American Sportscaster Association. He won a regional Emmy Award for his play-by-play work during the U.S. World Cup 1994. In 2004, Cantor received the Hispanic Heritage Award. Also that year he won the Broadcasting & Cable/Multichannel News Lifetime Achievement Award in Hispanic Television at the Hispanic Television Summit, produced by Schramm Marketing Group. In 2005, Cantor received an honorary Emmy from the NATPE for his contributions to Hispanic television. In 2014, Cantor received an Emmy at the 35th annual Sports Emmy Awards for best on-air personality in Spanish. FIFA Magazine named Cantor as one of the world's most legendary broadcasters.

In 2020, the National Soccer Hall of Fame announced that Cantor would be named the 2020 Colin Jose Media Award recipient for his significant long-term contributions to soccer in the United States Due to the COVID-19 pandemic, Cantor was awarded at the 2021 ceremony in Frisco, Texas.

Cantor has received a total of six Emmys.

Personal life
Cantor's son, Nico, contributes to CBS Sports' UEFA Champions League and UEFA Europa League coverage and hosts The Golazo! Show, a live whip-around program on CBS Sports Network that debuted during the group stage of the 2020–21 Champions League season.

See also
List of Jews in sports (non-players)

References

External links
 Twitter page
 Instagram page
 
Q&A with Cantor, Sports Illustrated, December 2002.

Living people
Association football commentators
University of Southern California alumni
Argentine emigrants to the United States
Argentine people of Romanian-Jewish descent
Argentine Jews
Argentine people of Polish-Jewish descent
Sportspeople from Buenos Aires
National Hockey League broadcasters
1962 births
Regional Emmy Award winners